Science advice is the process, structures and institutions through which governments and politicians consider science, technology and innovation information in policy- and decision- making. Across different national governments and international bodies, there are a variety of structures and institutions for scientific advice.  They reflect distinctive cultures and traditions of decision-making, which Sheila Jasanoff has termed the ‘civic epistemology’ through which expert claims are constructed, validated or challenged in a given society.

Science advice can also be called "science for policy," indicating the flow of information from scientific to policy domains with the intention of informing decisions. This is distinct from "policy for science," the institutions, rules and norms governing how science is funded, conducted, and communicated.

At the national level, countries have diverse models for how to connect scientists and policymakers. In some countries, the president of the National academy, an elected organization of distinguished researchers in natural and social sciences, engineering, medicine, and the humanities, serves as a government science advisor, while other countries have an advisory committee or civil servants perform this role. National academies are often commissioned to write reports advising government on the state of scientific knowledge to inform policy-relevant questions, such as the risk from chemicals or disease.

Other countries, such as the UK, have a wide range of sources of expert scientific advice which draw on several of these sources.

At the international level, there is an increasing movement to bring together national science advisors to share best practices and form a network to deal with global challenges (e.g., pandemics, climate change). The first global Science Advice to Governments meeting was held in Auckland, New Zealand on August 27–28, 2014.  This meeting brought together high-level science advisors, scientists, and practitioners to discuss the relationship between science and policy. A new network of European science academies was established at the European Open Science meeting in Copenhagen in June 2014, which now includes 20 countries.

The International Council for Science (ICSU) is a major international organization with a program in science for policy.

Science advice structures 
A briefing paper, described four of the most commonly used science advice structures for jurisdictions: advisory councils, advisory committees, national academies, and chief scientific advisors. These structures are most commonly employed at the national level, but may also be used in sub-national jurisdictions like Quebec, or supra-national bodies like the European Commission, which has an in-house science service, the Joint Research Centre.

Science advice also occurs at sub-national levels, where structures may include departmental scientific advisors (for example, the United States Environmental Protection Agency, and at the international level, where networks such as the International Council for Science coordinate science for policy, for example through serving as the science voice in the United Nations.

For any of these structures, individual experts may be asked for advice in specific circumstances.

Science advice by jurisdiction (nation-state, sub-national jurisdictions, and supra-national bodies)

References

Science education
Science policy